The 1911 Minnesota Golden Gophers football team was an American football team that represented the University of Minnesota in the Western Conference during the 1911 college football season. In their 12th year under head coach Henry L. Williams, the Golden Gophers compiled a 6–0–1 record (2–0–1 against Western Conference opponents), won the conference championship for the third consecutive year, and outscored their opponents by a combined total of 102 to 15. The team has been recognized retroactively as the national champion by the Billingsley Report.

Center Clifford Morrell and halfback Reuben Rosenwald were named All-Big Ten first team.

Schedule

References

Minnesota
Minnesota Golden Gophers football seasons
Big Ten Conference football champion seasons
College football undefeated seasons
Minnesota Golden Gophers football